Tsysha is a rural locality (a selo) in Kulinsky District, Republic of Dagestan, Russia. The population was 383 as of 2010. There are 13 streets.

Geography 
Tsysha is located 8 km northeast of Vachi (the district's administrative centre) by road. Khoymi and Kaya are the nearest rural localities.

Nationalities 
Laks live there.

References 

Rural localities in Kulinsky District